Sudhir Kumar  Padma Raju (born 13 April 1979) is an Indian weightlifter. He won the bronze medal in the Men's 69 kg category at the 2006 Commonwealth Games, with a combined lift of 287 kilograms.

References

Indian male weightlifters
Living people
Commonwealth Games bronze medallists for India
Weightlifters at the 2010 Asian Games
Commonwealth Games medallists in weightlifting
1979 births
Weightlifters at the 2010 Commonwealth Games
Weightlifters at the 2006 Commonwealth Games
Asian Games competitors for India
Place of birth missing (living people)
20th-century Indian people
21st-century Indian people
Medallists at the 2006 Commonwealth Games
Medallists at the 2010 Commonwealth Games